Humiriastrum is a genus of flowering plants in the family Humiriaceae. There are about 16 species distributed in Central and South America.

Species include:
Humiriastrum colombianum
Humiriastrum cuspidatum
Humiriastrum dentatum
Humiriastrum diguense
Humiriastrum excelsum
Humiriastrum glaziovii
Humiriastrum liesneri
 Humiriastrum melanocarpum (Cuatrec.) Cuatrec.
Humiriastrum obovatum
Humiriastrum ottohuberi
Humiriastrum piraparanense
Humiriastrum procerum
Humiriastrum spiritu-sancti
Humiriastrum subcrenatum
Humiriastrum villosum

References

Humiriaceae
Malpighiales genera
Taxonomy articles created by Polbot